Bladen County is a county located in the U.S. state of North Carolina. As of the 2020 census, the population was 29,606. Its county seat is Elizabethtown. The county was created in 1734 as Bladen Precinct and gained county status in 1739.

History
Bladen County was formed in 1734 as Bladen Precinct of Bath County, from New Hanover Precinct. It was named for Martin Bladen, a member of the Board of Trade. With the abolition of Bath County in 1739, all of its constituent precincts became counties.

Bladen's original residents included the Waccamaw people.

Bladen County began as a vast territory, with indefinite northern and western boundaries.  Reductions in its extent began in 1750, when its western part became Anson County. In 1754 the northern part of what was left of Bladen County became Cumberland County.  In 1764 the southern part of what remained of Bladen County was combined with part of New Hanover County to form Brunswick County.  In 1787 the western part of the now much smaller county became Robeson County.  Finally, in 1808 the southern part of Bladen County was combined with part of Brunswick County to form Columbus County.
Bladen County is considered the "mother county" of North Carolina because of the 100 counties in North Carolina, 55 of them at one point belonged to Bladen County.

Geography

It is the fourth-largest county in North Carolina by land area.

State and local protected areas 
 Bakers Lake State Natural Area
 Bay Tree Lake State Natural Area
 Bladen Lakes State Forest
 Jones Lake State Park
 Singletary Lake State Park
 Suggs Mill Pond Game Land
 Turnbull Creek Educational State Forest
 White State Lake

Major water bodies 

 Bay Tree Lake
 Slades Swamp
 Black River, home of the oldest documented Taxodium distichum (bald cypress) at  years old
 Cape Fear River
 Jones Lake
 Little Singletary Lake
 Salters Lake
 Singletary Lake
 South River
 White Lake

Adjacent counties
 Cumberland County - north
 Sampson County - northeast
 Pender County - east
 Columbus County - south
 Robeson County - west

Major highways

Major infrastructure 
 Curtis L. Brown Jr. Field
 Elwell Ferry, river ferry across the Cape Fear River.

Demographics

2020 census

As of the 2020 United States census, there were 29,606 people, 13,636 households, and 8,691 families residing in the county.

Between 2010 and 2020, Bladen County experienced a population decline of 15.9 percent.

2000 census
As of the census of 2000, there were 32,278 people, 12,897 households, and 8,937 families residing in the county.  The population density was 37 people per square mile (14/km2).  There were 15,316 housing units at an average density of 18 per square mile (7/km2).  The racial makeup of the county was 57.22% White, 37.91% Black or African American, 2.04% Native American, 0.10% Asian, 0.04% Pacific Islander, 1.97% from other races, and 0.73% from two or more races.  3.71% of the population were Hispanic or Latino of any race.

By 2005 55.8% of the population of Bladen County was non-Hispanic whites.  36.8% of the population was African-American.  5.0% of the population of was Latino.  2.3% of the population was Native American.

There were 12,897 households, out of which 30.40% had children under the age of 18 living with them, 48.90% were married couples living together, 15.70% had a female householder with no husband present, and 30.70% were non-families. 27.70% of all households were made up of individuals, and 11.50% had someone living alone who was 65 years of age or older.  The average household size was 2.45 and the average family size was 2.97.

In the county, the population was spread out, with 24.60% under the age of 18, 8.70% from 18 to 24, 27.20% from 25 to 44, 25.20% from 45 to 64, and 14.20% who were 65 years of age or older.  The median age was 38 years. For every 100 females there were 92.60 males.  For every 100 females age 18 and over, there were 88.70 males.

The median income for a household in the county was $26,877, and the median income for a family was $33,974. Males had a median income of $27,799 versus $21,973 for females. The per capita income for the county was $14,735.  About 16.60% of families and 21.00% of the population were below the poverty line, including 28.70% of those under age 18 and 24.20% of those age 65 or over.

Government and politics

Government 
Bladen County is a member of the Lumber River Council of Governments, a regional planning board representing five counties.

It lies within the bounds of North Carolina's 15th Prosecutorial District, the 13A Superior Court District, and the 13th District Court District.

Politics 

Following the 2018 United States Midterm Elections, an investigation was opened into accusations of an absentee ballot fraud scheme directed by McCrae Dowless in Bladen County, within North Carolina's 9th Congressional District. Accusations were based around the Republican Primary election, in which Mark Harris defeated incumbent Robert Pittenger, and around the general election, in which Harris initially appeared to defeat Democrat Dan McCready. , the investigation is currently ongoing. Wake County District Attorney Lorrin Freeman, Democrat, said it was possible over 1,000 ballots had been destroyed. According to District Attorney Jon David, Republican, the county has a "troubled history of political groups exploiting the use of absentee ballots." The scandal brought national media attention to Bladen.

As of 2022, Bladen County is home to about 22,000 registered voters, comprising about 9,700 registered Democrats, about 5,100 Republicans, and about 7,000 unaffiliated voters.

Healthcare 
Bladen County is served by a single hospital, Cape Fear Valley Medical Center, based in Elizabethtown. According to the 2022 County Health Rankings produced by the University of Wisconsin Population Health Institute, Bladen County ranked 85th in health outcomes of North Carolina's 100 counties, an improvement of 10 ranks over the previous five years. Per the ranking, 26 percent of adults say they are in poor or fair health, the average life expectancy is 75 years, and 16 percent of people under the age of 65 lack health insurance. It has one primary care physician per 4,670 residents.

Economy
Agriculture constitutes a major part of Bladen County's economy. Smithfield Foods operates a pork processing facility north of the town of Tar Heel, the largest such plant in the world. It employs 5,800 workers, making it the county's largest employer. The county is the largest producer of blueberries in the state. Area farmers also grow soybeans, peanuts, corn, wheat, and cotton. The county suffers from a large poverty rate and is one of the most economically-distressed counties in the state. According to census figures, about 70 percent of working people in Bladen are employed outside the county.

Communities

Towns
 Bladenboro
 Clarkton
 Dublin
 East Arcadia
 Elizabethtown (county seat and largest town)
 Tar Heel
 White Lake

Census-designated places
 Butters
 Kelly
 White Oak

Unincorporated communities
 Abbottsburg
 Ammon
 Ammon Ford
 Carvers
 Colly Township
 Council
 Rosindale

Townships

 Abbottsburg
 Bethel
 Bladenboro
 Brown Marsh
 Carvers Creek
 Central
 Clarkton
 Colly
 Cypress Creek
 Elizabethtown
 East Arcadia
 Frenches Creek
 Hollow
 Lake Creek
 Tarheel
 Turnbull
 White Oak
 Dublin
 Whites Creek

Population ranking
The population ranking of the following table is based on the 2022 estimate of Bladen County.

† county seat

See also
 List of counties in North Carolina
 National Register of Historic Places listings in Bladen County, North Carolina
 North Carolina state park
 List of North Carolina state forests
 List of lakes in North Carolina
 Waccamaw Siouan Indians, state-recognized tribe that resides in the county
 Colcor, political corruption investigation carried out in neighboring Columbus County

References

External links

 
 
 Bladen Journal, Google news archive. —PDFs of 2,696 issues, dating from 1929 to 1985.

 
1739 establishments in North Carolina
Populated places established in 1739